West Winfield is a village in the town of Winfield in Herkimer County, New York, United States. The population was 826 at the 2010 census. The village is indirectly named after General Winfield Scott. The village is south of Utica.

History 

An early school in the town, the West Winfield Academy (Mt. Markham), was established in 1850.

The Bonfoy–Barstow House was listed on the National Register of Historic Places in 2011.

Geography

A branch of the Unadilla River, a tributary of the Susquehanna River, flows through the village.

The village is on U.S. Route 20 (Main Street) at the junction of New York State Route 51 (South Street). US-20 leads east  to Richfield Springs and west  to Bridgewater. NY-51 leads south  to Burlington Flats.

Demographics

As of the census of 2000, there were 862 people, 352 households, and 241 families residing in the village. The population density was 959.3 people per square mile (369.8/km2). There were 372 housing units at an average density of 414.0 per square mile (159.6/km2). The racial makeup of the village was 99.65% White, 0.23% Asian and 0.12% Pacific Islander. Hispanic or Latino of any race were 0.12% of the population.

There were 352 households, out of which 27.6% had children under the age of 18 living with them, 53.1% were married couples living together, 11.4% had a female householder with no husband present, and 31.5% were non-families. 29.0% of all households were made up of individuals, and 19.9% had someone living alone who was 65 years of age or older. The average household size was 2.45 and the average family size was 3.00.

In the village, the population was spread out, with 26.0% under the age of 18, 7.0% from 18 to 24, 20.9% from 25 to 44, 25.5% from 45 to 64, and 20.6% who were 65 years of age or older. The median age was 41 years. For every 100 females, there were 88.2 males. For every 100 females age 18 and over, there were 84.9 males.

The median income for a household in the village was $33,947, and the median income for a family was $42,031. Males had a median income of $26,793 versus $23,500 for females. The per capita income for the village was $16,465. About 7.6% of families and 9.1% of the population were below the poverty line, including 11.9% of those under age 18 and 8.4% of those age 65 or over.

Schools
The village is within the Mt. Markham Central School District. The Mt. Markham Middle School is located within the village, however the high school and elementary school are located just outside the village but still within the town of Winfield.

References

External links
 Village of West Winfield official website
 Village of West Winfield, NY

Villages in New York (state)
Utica–Rome metropolitan area
Villages in Herkimer County, New York